Daniel Felipe Pineda Osorio (born 5 November 1993 in Pereira, Colombia) is a Colombian male archer who competed individual event at the 2012 Summer Olympics. Pineda won the bronze medal in the individual event of the 2011 Pan American Games. He competed at the 2015 World Archery Championships in Copenhagen, Denmark.

He competed at the 2020 Summer Olympics.

References 

Colombian male archers
1993 births
Living people
Archers at the 2012 Summer Olympics
Olympic archers of Colombia
People from Pereira, Colombia
Archers at the 2011 Pan American Games
Archers at the 2015 Pan American Games
Archers at the 2019 Pan American Games
Pan American Games silver medalists for Colombia
Pan American Games bronze medalists for Colombia
Pan American Games medalists in archery
Central American and Caribbean Games silver medalists for Colombia
Competitors at the 2014 Central American and Caribbean Games
South American Games silver medalists for Colombia
South American Games gold medalists for Colombia
Central American and Caribbean Games gold medalists for Colombia
Central American and Caribbean Games bronze medalists for Colombia
South American Games medalists in archery
Competitors at the 2014 South American Games
Central American and Caribbean Games medalists in archery
Medalists at the 2019 Pan American Games
Medalists at the 2011 Pan American Games
Archers at the 2020 Summer Olympics
20th-century Colombian people
21st-century Colombian people